The 2004 Louisiana Republican presidential primary was held on March 9 in the U.S. state of Louisiana as one of the Republican Party's statewide nomination contests ahead of the 2004 presidential election.

Results

See also
 2004 Louisiana Democratic presidential primary
 2004 Republican Party presidential primaries
 2004 United States presidential election in Louisiana

References

Louisiana
Republican primary
2004